Liu Xiao (13 May 1908 – 11 June 1988) was a Chinese diplomat. He was born in Hunan Province. He joined the Communist Party of China in 1926. He was Ambassador of China to the Soviet Union (1955–1962) and Albania (April–September 1967).

References

湖南省地方志编纂委员会编. 湖南省志 第30卷 人物志 下. 长沙: 湖南出版社. 1995: 999–1000. .
张明金、刘立勤. 中国人民解放军历史上的200个军区. 北京: 解放军文艺出版社. 2010: 26. .
 中华苏维埃共和国中央执行委员会布告. 1934-02-03 [2015-07-30].
 《中国人民解放军军史》编写组. 中国人民解放军军史：第一卷. 军事科学出版社. 2010: 431. .
 何等強. 任弼时指导援西军改编. 人民网. 2015-01-08 [2015-08-25].
 江苏省地方志编纂委员会编. 江苏省志 62 上 中共志. 南京: 江苏人民出版社. 2013: 47. .
 第七届中央委员会（1945年6月-1956年9月）. 中国共产党新闻网. [2015-08-25].
 中共中央党史研究室第一研究部编. 中国共产党第七次全国代表大会代表名录 下. 上海: 上海人民出版社. 2005: 706. .
 辰溪县志编纂委员会编. 辰溪县志. 北京: 生活·读书·新知三联书店. 1994: 810–811. .
 翁明. 特殊时期的驻苏大使刘晓. 世纪. 2003, (4).
 王琦. 历届中共中央委员人名词典 1921-1987. 中共党史出版社. 1992: 87. .

1908 births
1988 deaths
Ambassadors of China to the Soviet Union
Ambassadors of China to Albania
National Central University alumni
Alternate members of the 7th Central Committee of the Chinese Communist Party
Members of the 1st Chinese People's Political Consultative Conference
Members of the Standing Committee of the 2nd Chinese People's Political Consultative Conference
Members of the Standing Committee of the 3rd Chinese People's Political Consultative Conference
Members of the Standing Committee of the 4th Chinese People's Political Consultative Conference
Members of the Standing Committee of the 5th Chinese People's Political Consultative Conference
Members of the Central Advisory Commission
Politicians from Huaihua
Chinese Communist Party politicians from Hunan
People's Republic of China politicians from Hunan